Spondin-1 (also known as F-spondin) is a protein that in humans is encoded by the SPON1 gene. It is secreted by cells of the floor plate and may be involved in axon guidance The protein contains 807 amino acids and is structurally composed of six thrombospondin domains, one reelin domain, and one spondin domain.

References

Further reading

External links 
 

Extracellular matrix proteins